Adam Julian Coombes (born 19 June 1991) is an English footballer who plays for Tonbridge Angels as a striker.

Adam has signed for Tonbridge Angels and played a part on his debut.

Club career

Chelsea
Coombes was scouted by Chelsea while playing in the Non League for Sutton United and being offered a chance to join the Chelsea Academy. His progress continued and he was offered a two-year scholarship from the start of the 2007–08 season.

The 2011–12 season started with good form shown and a reserve team goal scored in the opening month but then the highly unfortunate run of injuries continued. In August 2011, Coombes suffered a knee injury, being sidelined for six to nine months.

In January 2012 Coombes signed a 12-month extension to a contract that had six months to run, and returned from injury towards the end of the season to make three substitute appearances. He was released by Chelsea with 6 months still remaining on his contract in January 2013 to give him a better chance in finding a club before those released in the summer.

Yeovil Town (loan)
On 15 November 2010, Coombes was loaned out to Football League One club Yeovil Town on a month's youth loan, and made his debut five days later, in a 2–3 away defeat against Charlton Athletic. He made three substitute appearances before returning to Chelsea.

Notts County
On 1 August 2013 Coombes signed for Notts County.
On 27 August 2013, he scored the equalizing goal with his first touch after coming on as a substitute against Liverpool in a 4–2 defeat at Anfield in the League Cup.

Bromley
On 22 January 2016, it was announced that Coombes had signed for National League side Bromley. He scored his first goal for the club in a 3–1 defeat away to Gateshead on 23 April. He was released by the club at the end of the season.

Welling United
On 25 August, it was announced that Coombes had signed for Welling United, linking up with Mark Goldberg, whom he worked under at Bromley. Coombes proved prolific in the first half of the 2016–17 season for Welling. Between August and 1 January 2017 he scored 29 goals in 24 matches in all competitions, including a rare double hat-trick in a 7-1 FA Cup 4th Qualifying Round victory over Swindon Supermarine on 1 October 2016. The double hat-trick equaled Welling's 'most goals in a match' club record set in 1985 by John Bartley.

Coombes continued prolific goal-scoring form into 2017, and left Welling for Sutton United on 22 February 2017 with a 0.83 goals ratio (a goal every 103 minutes) from 20 League matches for the Wings.

Sutton United
On 24 February 2017, Coombes returned to boyhood club Sutton United after impressing at Welling United. On 25 February, Coombes made his debut for Sutton in a 3–2 victory against Torquay United at Plainmoor. On 28 February, Coombes made his first home appearance in a 1–0 victory over Boreham Wood, assisting the game's only goal for Maxime Biamou. Coombes scored his first goals for Sutton on 22 April, a brace in a 5–2 home win over Chester.

Return to Welling United
On 10 March 2018, it was announced that Coombes had re-signed for Welling United, in a deal to run until 2020, which would see Coombes link up with Welling United Chairman Mark Goldberg for the third time, having previously worked under Goldberg at Bromley and Welling United.

Billericay Town
Coombes signed for recently promoted National League South side Billericay Town on 20 July 2018. He made his debut for his new side on 4 August starting in a 4–0 away victory over Truro City and scored his first goal 10 days later against the side he signed from, Welling United. However, this proved to be his only goal in his first 8 matches and on 28 September returned to Welling United on a short loan. In his first game back for the Wings he scored both goals in a 2–1 victory over Slough Town. Coombes returned to Billericay after less than a month and in his first game back came off the bench against East Thurrock United with the scoreline 0–2 to the visitors and proceeded to score twice as Billericay mounted a comeback to win the game 3–2.

On 28 September 2018, he was loaned out to Welling United for one month. He was released by Billericay at the end of the 2018-19 season.

Welling United
In the summer 2019, Coombes returned to Welling United, this time on a permanent deal. On 26 December 2019, he was loaned out to Wealdstone F.C. until 31 January 2020.

Personal life
He was previously known as Adam Phillip, but officially changed his surname in July 2012 to adopt the use of his mother's maiden name.

Career statistics

References

External links

1991 births
Living people
Footballers from Carshalton
English footballers
England youth international footballers
Association football forwards
Sutton United F.C. players
Chelsea F.C. players
Yeovil Town F.C. players
Notts County F.C. players
Bromley F.C. players
Welling United F.C. players
Hampton & Richmond Borough F.C. players
Billericay Town F.C. players
Wealdstone F.C. players
English Football League players
National League (English football) players